Shagrat may refer to:

Shagrat, an Orc in The Lord of the Rings by J. R. R. Tolkien
Shagrat (band), an English rock band formed by Steve Peregrin Took and Mick Farren, later led by Took alone
Shagrat (rodent), a hypothetical creature in the television series The Future Is Wild
Shajarat al-Durr, Sultan of Egypt

See also
Shagrath (born 1976), lead singer of Norwegian symphonic black metal band Dimmu Borgir